The Rolls-Royce Phantom V is a large four-door limousine produced by Rolls-Royce Limited from 1959 to 1968.  Based on the Silver Cloud II, it shares a V8 engine and General Motors Hydra-Matic automatic gearbox with that model. Rolls-Royce assembled the cars' chassis and drivetrains with bodies made to standard designs by coachbuilders Park Ward and James Young, former vendors absorbed by Rolls-Royce.

The engine is a 6,230 cc 90-degree V8 with twin SU carburettors, coupled to a 4-speed automatic transmission. The car has massive drum brakes and a wheelbase of 3,683 mm. Power assisted steering was standard.

A shallow gear gave a walking speed which was suitable for ceremonies. From 1963 onward, the Silver Cloud III's 7% more powerful engine and new front wings (incorporating the latter's quad headlamps) were fitted.

Park Ward vs James Young models

Of the 832 total built between 1959 and 1968, James Young made 217 bodies. Park Ward, owned by Rolls-Royce, made 607 bodies. In 1962, H. J. Mulliner & Co. was merged by Rolls-Royce with Park Ward to form Mulliner Park Ward. Prior to the merger, eight Phantom Vs had been made by H.J. Mulliner.

Famous owners

John Lennon

Beatle John Lennon bought a 1964 Mulliner Park Ward Phantom V, finished in Valentines black. Everything was black except for the radiator, even the wheels. Lennon asked for the radiator to be black as well, but Rolls-Royce refused.

Originally the car was customised from Park Ward with black leather upholstery, cocktail cabinet with fine-wood trim, writing table, reading lamps, a seven-piece his-and-hers black-hide luggage set, and a Perdio portable television. A refrigeration system was put in the boot, and it was one of the first cars in England to have tinted windows. He probably paid £11,000 (nearly £210,000 in today's general inflation value). Lennon didn't know how to drive and didn't get his driving licence until 1965, at twenty-four years of age. He sometimes hired a 6'4" Welsh guardsman named Les Anthony.

In December 1965, Lennon made a seven-page list of changes that cost more than £1900: the back seat could change into a double bed, a Philips Auto-Mignon AG2101 floating record player that prevented the needle from jumping, a Radio Telephone and a cassette tape deck were added, while speakers were mounted in the front wheel wells so that occupants could talk outside via microphone.

The car needed a new paint job after Lennon used it in Spain during his filming in Richard Lester's How I Won the War. Lennon commissioned a custom paint job from private coach makers J.P. Fallon Ltd. in the style of a Romany gypsy wagon (not "psychedelic" as often referenced). Artist Steve Weaver painted the red, orange, green and blue swirls, floral side panels and a Libra on the roof.
Lennon was in a 60s mood and wanted to make a statement to the English establishment. He loved telling a story about an elderly woman who hit the car with her umbrella.

To match his later White Album period Lennon also bought another, all-white Phantom V in 1968.
In 1977 Lennon donated the yellow Phantom V to the Cooper-Hewitt Museum at the Smithsonian Institution to cover an IRS bill of $250,000. The Cooper-Hewitt sold the car in 1985 for $2,299,000 to Canadian businessman Jim Pattison, who donated it to the Province of British Columbia. It was on display during Expo 86 in Vancouver, and since 1993 it has been in the Royal British Columbia Museum in Canada.

Queen Elizabeth II 
Two cars built in 1960 and 1961 joined the fleet of two earlier Phantom IVs. Having been retired from active service in 2002, both are now on public display: one in the royal motor museum at Sandringham, and the other in the special garage aboard HMY Britannia in Leith, Edinburgh.  Queen Elizabeth, the Queen Mother acquired a Rolls-Royce Phantom V Landaulet (registration plate NLT 1) in 1962 which is now used by Charles III.

Others

Celebrities and tycoons

Elton John had a pink 1960 Park Ward. 

Liberace had a 1961 that became a part of his show at the Las Vegas Hilton. It also appeared in the movie Behind the Candelabra

Elvis Presley had a 1963 James Young. It came with few extra options but did have a telephone, Firestone whitewall tyres, electric windows, and air conditioning. The centre rear armrest had a writing pad, mirror and clothes brush. An unusual feature was a microphone for the singer. It was originally painted Midnight blue, but Elvis had to repaint it a light silver as his mother's chickens kept pecking the paint.

Politicians and royalty
The Governor of Hong Kong Chris Patten used a Phantom V for ceremonial occasions. It was removed from Hong Kong by the Royal Navy immediately following the handover to China on 1 July 1997.

The Philippines has a 1960 Phantom V that was owned by former First Lady Imelda Romualdez Marcos, wife of President Ferdinand Marcos. The car is currently displayed at the Philippine Presidential Car Museum.

Mohammad Reza Pahlavi, the Shah of Iran, owned a Phantom V. Since his exile, the car has been kept in his royal residence in Tehran and is occasionally shown to the public among the other luxurious cars owned by the Shah, including a unique Rolls-Royce Phantom VI and a Phantom IV.

Yugoslav president Josip Broz Tito had a 1960 Rolls-Royce Phantom V in presidential collection for representative purposes. The car is now displayed at the Museum of Yugoslavia, Belgrade.

Romanian dictator Nicolae Ceausescu bought a 1967 landaulet but returned it to Rolls-Royce upon the disapproval of the Politburo. It was used by Queen Elizabeth II on two-state visits.

List of notable Phantom V owners 

Celebrities

Elton John
Elvis Presley
John Lennon
Liberace

Politicians and royalty

Charles III
Chris Patten
Elizabeth II
Imelda Marcos
Josip Broz Tito
Mohammad Reza Pahlavi
Nicolae Ceausescu
Queen Elizabeth The Queen Mother

References

External links 

 Rolls-Royce Phantom V

Cars introduced in 1959
Cars discontinued in 1968
1960s cars
Rear-wheel-drive vehicles
Rolls-Royce Phantom
Sedans